Sciadopitys, commonly called umbrella pines, is a genus of a unique conifers now endemic to Japan. The sole living member of the family Sciadopityaceae is Sciadopitys verticillata, a living fossil. The oldest fossils of Sciadopitys are from the Late Cretaceous of Japan, and the genus was widespread in Laurasia during most of the Cenozoic, especially in Europe until the Pliocene.

References

Pinales
Conifer genera